Komodo Airport  is an airport near the town of Labuan Bajo on the island of Flores in East Nusa Tenggara province, Indonesia. The airport's name comes from Labuan Bajo's status as a departure point for tours to the nearby Komodo National Park, home of the Komodo dragon.

It was formerly known as Mutiara II Airport, not to be confused with Mutiara Airport located near the city of Palu in Indonesia's Central Sulawesi province. In September 2013 the first Boeing 737-800 landed and took off successfully.

Facilities

On 27 December 2015, President Joko Widodo inaugurated a new modern terminal at the airport.  The larger terminal will be able to provide passenger services for up to 1.5 million passengers per year compared with the capacity of the old terminal of around 150,000 passengers per annum.  The new infrastructure is thus expected to encourage a marked increase in the number of tourists coming to the island of Flores and its surroundings.

In addition, the foundation also extended runway with a length of 2,250 meters and a width of 45 meters which can accommodate aircraft jet medium class such as the Airbus A320, Boeing 737-800, and Boeing 737-900ER. Previously the airport was only able to accommodate smaller aircraft such as the ATR 72 propeller aircraft.

It is estimated that 16 aircraft can land and take off each day with the expansion of the runway. In the future this service will also be sought to operate 24 hours.

Expansion
Indonesia's publicly listed PT Cardig Aero Service (CAS Group) air transportation service company and Changi Airports International (CAI), a subsidiary of Singapore's Changi Airport Group – had won the public-private partnership (PPP) tender for the Komodo Airport expansion project, which has an estimated investment value of Rp 1.2 trillion (US$85.82 million). The airport will be operated by the consortium for 25 years and then handed it to the Directorate General of Civil Aviation of the Transportation Ministry.

The airport is expected to accommodate up to 4 million passengers per year. The runway will also be extended from 2,250 meters to 2,750 meters, while the apron area is expanded to 20,200 square meters. The domestic terminal will be expanded to 6,500 square meters, and an international terminal will be built with an area of 5,538 square meters with several other supporting facilities.

Airlines and destinations

Passenger

Incidents
On September 14, 2011, an Aviastar aircraft hit a group of cows upon landing at Komodo Airport slightly damaging the forward part of the aircraft.  Airport officers on motorcycles had attempted to drive the cows away before the aircraft landed.

References

External links
Komodo Airport - Indonesia Airport Global Website
 
 

Airports in East Nusa Tenggara